"My Everything" is the second single released by American boy band 98 Degrees from their third studio album, Revelation. "My Everything" did not achieve the success of their previous single, "Give Me Just One Night (Una Noche)", but did reach the top 40 on the US Billboard Hot 100. Internationally, it managed to appear on the Australian Singles Chart, peaking at number 88 in March 2001.

Music video
The music video features an appearance by Nick Lachey is with Jessica Simpson plays a waitress who works at the restaurant and hugged him who plays a tow truck driver. Drew Lachey is returning from U.S. military service and the woman he hugs is his real-life high school sweetheart and wife Lea. Justin Jeffre's scene takes place in a church, a cemetery, and later seen at home looking at a photo album. Jeff Timmons's scene takes at an auto repair shop as a mechanic looking at a photo of their daughter.

Track listings
Australasian CD single
 "My Everything"
 "Give Me Just One Night (Una Noche)" (Hex Hector club mix)
 "Can You Imagine"
 "Never Let Go"

Japanese CD single
 "My Everything"
 "Give Me Just One Night (Una Noche)" (Kns Groove mix)
 "Give Me Just One Night (Una Noche)" (Kns mix)
 "Give Me Just One Night (Una Noche)" (Hex Hector club mix)
 "Give Me Just One Night (Una Noche)" (Spanish version)

Charts

Weekly charts

Year-end charts

Release history

References

2000 singles
2000 songs
98 Degrees songs
Music videos directed by Bille Woodruff
Songs written by Anders Bagge
Songs written by Arnthor Birgisson
Songs written by Nick Lachey
Universal Music Group singles